Daam Foulon (born 23 March 1999) is a Belgian footballer who plays as a defender for Benevento.

Career statistics

References

External links

Living people
1999 births
Belgian footballers
Belgium youth international footballers
Belgian expatriate footballers
Association football defenders
S.K. Beveren players
Benevento Calcio players
Belgian Pro League players
Serie A players
Serie B players
Expatriate footballers in Italy
Sportspeople from Mechelen
Footballers from Antwerp Province